Brian Timothy Geraghty (born May 13, 1975) is an American actor, known for his roles in the 2005 film Jarhead, the 2008 film The Hurt Locker, and in the 2012 film Flight, along with his recurring role in the HBO drama series Boardwalk Empire. He appeared as a regular on NBC's Chicago P.D. from 2014 to 2016 and played Theodore Roosevelt in the TV series The Alienist. From 2020 to 2022, he was a main character on the ABC crime drama Big Sky.

Early life
Geraghty was born in Toms River, New Jersey, and is of Irish descent. He graduated from Toms River High School East in 1993 and then studied acting at the Neighborhood Playhouse School of Theatre before beginning his professional career in New York City; he later moved to Los Angeles.

Career
Geraghty was featured in a small role in the crime drama The Sopranos. Feature roles soon followed, in such pictures as Jarhead, Bobby, The Guardian, We Are Marshall, and The Hurt Locker. He also appeared in the January 6, 2010, episode of Law & Order: Special Victims Unit, "Quickie", as a man intentionally infecting women with HIV. In 2013, he portrayed Agent Knox on the HBO crime drama series Boardwalk Empire. In August 2014, Geraghty was cast as a series regular on the second season of the NBC procedural Chicago P.D., playing Sean Roman. In 2018, Geraghty starred in the TNT drama The Alienist, as NYPD Police Commissioner Theodore Roosevelt.

Personal life
In his free time, Geraghty enjoys surfing.

Filmography

Film

Television

Awards and nominations

References

External links

 

1975 births
20th-century American male actors
21st-century American male actors
American male film actors
American male television actors
American people of Irish descent
Living people
Male actors from New Jersey
People from Toms River, New Jersey
Toms River High School East alumni